Río Arenas is the name given to two rivers in Puerto Rico:

 Río Arenas (Las Marias, Puerto Rico)
 Río Arenas (Yabucoa, Puerto Rico)

See also
 Rio Arena or Jeunesse Arena, in Rio de Janeiro, Brazil
 Arenas (disambiguation)